The Crowne Plaza Copenhagen Challenge was a golf tournament on the Challenge Tour, played at the Royal Golf Club in Copenhagen, Denmark. It was played for the only time in 2012.

Winners

References

External links
Coverage on the Challenge Tour's official site

Former Challenge Tour events
Golf tournaments in Denmark
InterContinental Hotels Group